The LA Giltinis are a former Major League Rugby team based in Los Angeles, California, United States. The team was announced in 2020 and entered the league in the 2021 season as an expansion franchise. The Giltinis, named for a yet-to-be-released cocktail, were owned by Adam Gilchrist and Loyals Rugby. It was based in El Segundo, California, and played at the Los Angeles Memorial Coliseum. Darren Coleman was announced as the head coach.

The club won the MLR Shield in their inaugural season, but were disqualified from the playoffs in 2022. The Glintis and the Austin Gilgronis—another MLR team owned by Gilchrist—were removed from the league in October 2022.

History

A potential Los Angeles expansion bid for MLR, led by LA Coast Rugby and Adam Gilchrist, was announced in 2018 with plans for the team to enter the league in 2019. The team's bid was later replaced by a new proposal from Loyals Rugby, who were announced as the winners of the expansion team in 2020. The team, named for a cocktail like the Austin Gilgronis, began play in 2021. In its first season, the Giltinis posted a 12–4 record, hosted, and defeated Rugby ATL in the MLR final, winning the shield.

During the 2022 season, MLR announced that the Giltinis and the Gilgronis—both owned by Gilchrist—were disqualified from the playoffs due to a violation of league rules, allegedly including salary cap issues. Gilchrist filed suit against the league in June 2022; the two teams were expelled from the league in October following a failed attempt to sell both teams.

Stadium

The Giltinis played at the Los Angeles Memorial Coliseum, a multi-use stadium in Exposition Park, Los Angeles.

Sponsorship

Roster

The LA Giltinis squad for the 2022 Major League Rugby season was:

 Senior 15s internationally capped players are listed in bold.
 MLR teams are allowed to field up to ten overseas players per match.

Head coaches
  Darren Coleman (2021)
  Stephen Hoiles (2021–present)

Assistant coaches
  Orene Ai’i (Backs, 2021–present)
  Adam Ashley-Cooper (Backs, 2022)
  Dave Dennis (Forwards, 2022)

Captains
  Dave Dennis (2021–present)

Records
LA Giltinis won the Major League Rugby Championship Shield in their inaugural season (2021).

Season standings

Honors
Major League Rugby
Champions: 2021
Playoff appearances: 2021

References

External links

Major League Rugby teams
2020 establishments in California
Rugby union teams in California
Rugby clubs established in 2020
Sports in Los Angeles
LA Giltinis
Defunct rugby union teams